Kenneth Anger (born Kenneth Wilbur Anglemyer, February 3, 1927) is an American underground experimental filmmaker, actor, and author. Working exclusively in short films, he has produced almost 40 works since 1937, nine of which have been grouped together as the "Magick Lantern Cycle". His films variously merge surrealism with homoeroticism and the occult, and have been described as containing "elements of erotica, documentary, psychodrama, and spectacle". Anger has been called "one of America's first openly gay filmmakers, and certainly the first whose work addressed homosexuality in an undisguised, self-implicating manner", and his "role in rendering gay culture visible within American cinema, commercial or otherwise [...] impossible to overestimate", with several films released before the legalization of homosexual acts between consenting adults in the United States. He focused on occult themes in many of his films, being fascinated by the English gnostic mage and poet Aleister Crowley, and is an adherent of Thelema, the religion Crowley founded.

Born to a middle-class Presbyterian family in Santa Monica, California, Anger later claimed to have been a child actor who appeared in the film A Midsummer Night's Dream (1935); the accuracy of this claim is disputed. He began making short films when he was ten years old, although his first film to gain any recognition, the homoerotic Fireworks (1947), was only produced a decade later. The work's controversial nature led to his trial on obscenity charges, but he was acquitted. A friendship and working relationship subsequently began with pioneering sexologist Alfred Kinsey. Moving to Europe, Anger produced a number of other shorts inspired by the artistic avant-garde scene there, such as Rabbit's Moon (released 1971) and Eaux d'Artifice (1953).

Returning to the U.S. in 1953, Anger began work on several new projects, including the films Inauguration of the Pleasure Dome (1954), Scorpio Rising (1964), Kustom Kar Kommandos (1965), and the gossip book Hollywood Babylon (French edition, 1959; U.S. edition, 1965). The latter became infamous for various dubious and sensationalist claims, many of which were later disproved, though some remain urban legends. Getting to know several notable countercultural figures of the time, including Tennessee Williams, Mick Jagger, Keith Richards, Jimmy Page, Marianne Faithfull and Anton LaVey, Anger involved them in his subsequent Thelemite-themed works, Invocation of My Demon Brother (1969) and Lucifer Rising (1972). After failing to produce a sequel to Lucifer Rising, which he attempted through the mid-1980s, Anger retired from filmmaking, instead focusing on Hollywood Babylon II (1984). At the dawn of the 21st century he returned to filmmaking, producing shorts for various film festivals and events.

Anger has described filmmakers such as Auguste and Louis Lumière, Georges Méliès, and Maya Deren as influences, and has been cited as an important influence on directors like Martin Scorsese, David Lynch and John Waters. Kinsey Today argued that he had "a profound impact on the work of many other filmmakers and artists, as well as on music video as an emergent art form using dream sequence, dance, fantasy, and narrative."

Biography

1927–35: Early life 

Anger was born in Santa Monica, California, as Kenneth Wilbur Anglemyer on February 3, 1927. His family was Presbyterian, but he became more interested in the occult. His father, Wilbur Anglemyer, was of German ancestry, and had been born in Troy, Ohio, while his disabled mother, Lillian Coler (the older of the pair), claimed English ancestry. Anger's parents met at the Ohio State University and after marrying had their first child, Jean Anglemyer, in 1918, followed by a second, Robert "Bob" Anglemyer, in 1921. That year they moved to Santa Monica to be near Lillian's mother, Bertha Coler, who herself had recently moved there. There Wilbur got a job as an electrical engineer at Douglas Aircraft, earning enough money that they could live comfortably as a middle-class family.

Kenneth, their third and final child, was born in 1927, but growing up he did not get along with his parents or siblings. His brother Bob later claimed that as the youngest child, Kenneth had been spoiled by his mother and grandmother, and became somewhat "bratty." His grandmother Bertha was a big influence on the young Kenneth, and supported the family financially during the Great Depression. It was she who first took Kenneth to the cinema, to see a double bill of The Singing Fool and Thunder Over Mexico. She encouraged his artistic interests and later moved into a house in Hollywood with another woman, Miss Diggy, who also encouraged Kenneth. He developed an early interest in film, and enjoyed reading the movie tie-in Big Little books. He later said, "I was a child prodigy who never got smarter." He retrospected his attendance at the Santa Monica Cotillon, where child stars were encouraged to mix with non-famous children and where he met Shirley Temple, with whom he once danced.

In 1935, he later claimed, Anger had the chance to appear in a Hollywood film, taking the role of the Changeling Prince in the 1935 Warner Brothers film A Midsummer Night's Dream. Set photographs and studio production reports (on file in the Warner Brothers collection at University of Southern California, and the Warner Bros. collection of studio key books at George Eastman House in Rochester, New York) contradict Anger's claims, showing that the character was played by a girl named Sheila Brown. Anger's unofficial biographer, Bill Landis, remarked in 1995 that the Changeling Prince was definitely "Anger as a child; visually, he's immediately recognizable".

1937–46: First films 
Anger's first film was created in 1937, when he was ten years old. The short, Ferdinand the Bull, was shot on the remains of 16 mm film that had been left unused after the Anglemyers had made home movies with it on a family vacation to Yosemite National Park. In Ferdinand the Bull, which has never been made publicly available, Kenneth dressed as a matador, wearing a cape, while two of his friends from the Boy Scouts played the bull. His second work, Who Has Been Rocking My Dreamboat, which Anger has often called his first proper film, was made from footage of children playing during the summer, accompanied with popular songs by bands, including the Ink Spots. Anger had created Who Has Been Rocking My Dreamboat in 1941, when he was 14, shortly before the Attack on Pearl Harbor and the subsequent entry of the U.S. into World War II. The next year, he produced another amateur film, Prisoner of Mars, which was heavily influenced by Flash Gordon. In this science fiction-inspired feature, in which he played the protagonist, he added elements taken from the Greek mythological myth of the Minotaur and constructed a small volcano in his back yard as a homemade special effect. Many of these early films are considered lost, with Anger burning much of his previous work in 1967.

In 1944, the Anglemyers moved to Hollywood to move in with family, and Kenneth began attending Beverly Hills High School. It was here, he met Maxine Peterson, who had once been the stand-in for Shirley Temple, and he asked her – alongside another classmate and an older woman – to appear in his next film project, which he initially called Demigods, later retitled as Escape Episode. Revolving partially around the occult, it was filmed in a "spooky old castle" in Hollywood, and was subsequently screened at the Coronet Theatre on North La Cienega Boulevard in Los Angeles. Around this time, Anger also began attending the screenings of silent films held at Clara Grossman's art gallery, through which he met a fellow filmmaker, Curtis Harrington, with whom he formed Creative Film Associates (CFA). Harrington is said to have introduced Anger to the work of Aleister Crowley. Crowley's philosophy of Thelema would exert a profound influence on the remainder of Anger's career. CFA was founded to distribute experimental films or "underground films" such as those of Maya Deren, John and James Whitney, as well as Anger's and Harrington's.

In high school, Anger started to become interested in the occult, which he had first indirectly encountered through reading L. Frank Baum's Oz books as a child, with their accompanying Rosicrucian philosophies. Kenneth was very interested in the works of the French ceremonial magician Eliphas Levi, as well as Sir James Frazer's The Golden Bough, although his favorite writings were those of the English occultist Aleister Crowley. Crowley had founded a religion known as Thelema based upon a spiritual experience that he had in Egypt in 1904, in which he claimed a being known as Aiwass had contacted him and recited to him The Book of the Law. Subsequent to his exposure to Crowley, Anger converted to Thelema.

1947–49: Fireworks and early career 
As Anger discovered his homosexuality, at a time when homosexual acts were still illegal in the United States, he began associating with the underground gay scene. At some point in the mid-1940s, he was arrested by the police in a "homosexual entrapment", after which he decided to move out of his parents' home, gaining his own sparse apartment largely financed by his grandmother, and abandoning the name Anglemyer in favor of Anger. He started attending the University of Southern California, where he studied cinema, and also began experimenting with the use of mind-altering drugs like cannabis and peyote. It was then that he decided to produce a film that would deal with his sexuality, just as other gay avant-garde film makers like Willard Maas were doing in that decade. The result was the short film Fireworks, which was created in 1947 but only exhibited publicly in 1948.

Upon release of the work, Anger was arrested on obscenity charges. He was acquitted, after the case went to the Supreme Court of California, which deemed it to be art rather than pornography. Anger made the claim to have been 17 years old when he made it, despite the fact that he was actually 20, presumably to present himself as more of an enfant terrible. A homoerotic work lasting only 14 minutes, Fireworks revolves around a young man (played by Anger himself) associating with various navy sailors, who eventually turn on him, stripping him naked and beating him to death, ripping open his chest to find a compass inside. Several fireworks then explode, accompanied by a burning Christmas tree and the final shot shows the young man lying in bed next to another shirtless man. Of this film, Anger would later state in 1966 that "This flick is all I have to say about being 17, the United States Navy, American Christmas and the fourth of July." He would continuously alter and adapt the film up until 1980, with it finally being distributed on VHS in 1986.

One of the first people to buy a copy of Fireworks was the sexologist Dr. Alfred Kinsey of the Institute for Sex Research. He and Anger struck up a friendship that would last until the doctor's death, during which time Anger aided Kinsey in his research. According to Anger's unofficial biographer Bill Landis, Kinsey became a "father figure" whom Anger "could both interact with and emulate." Meanwhile, in 1949 Anger began work on a film called Puce Women, which unlike Fireworks was filmed in color. It starred Yvonne Marquis as a glamorous woman going about her daily life; Anger would later state that "Puce Women was my love affair with Hollywood ... with all the great goddesses of the silent screen. They were to be filmed in their homes; I was, in effect, filming ghosts." A lack of funding meant that only one scene was ever produced, which was eventually released under the title Puce Moment. That same year, Anger directed The Love That Whirls, a film based upon Aztec human sacrifice but, because of the nudity that it contained, it was destroyed by technicians at the film lab, who deemed it to be obscene.

1950–53: France, Rabbit's Moon and Eaux d'Artifice 
In 1950, Anger moved to Paris, France, where he initially stayed with friends of his (who themselves had been forced to leave Hollywood after being blacklisted for formerly having belonged to trade union organisations). He would later remark that he travelled to the country after receiving a letter from the French director Jean Cocteau in which he told Anger of his admiration for Fireworks (shown in 1949 at Festival du Film Maudit in Biarritz, France). Upon arrival, Anger and Cocteau became friends, with the Frenchman giving the young protege his permission to make a movie of his ballet The Young Man and Death, although at the time there were no financial backers for the project. While in Paris he continued producing short films; in 1950 he started filming on Rabbit's Moon, which was also known as La Lune des Lapins and revolved around a clown who was staring up at the moon, in which a rabbit lived, something found within Japanese mythology. Anger produced 20 minutes of footage at the Films du Pantheon Studio in the city before he was rushed out of the studio, leaving the film uncompleted. He stored the footage in the disorganized archives of the Cinémathèque Française, and only collected it again in 1970, when he finally finished and released Rabbit's Moon. It was at the Cinémathèque Française that he was given by the head, Henri Langlois, prints of Sergei Eisenstein's Que Viva Mexico!, which he attempted to put into Eisenstein's original order.

In 1953, he travelled to Rome, Italy where he planned to make a film about the sixteenth century occultist Cardinal d'Este. To do so, he began filming at the garden of the Villa d'Este in Tivoli, in which a lady in eighteenth century dress walked through the gardens, which featured many waterfalls (an allusion to the fact that d'Este allegedly sexually enjoyed urination), accompanied by the music of Vivaldi. This was supposedly going to be only the first of four scenes, but the others were not made; the resulting one-scene film was titled Eaux d'Artifice. As Anger's biographer Bill Landis remarked, "It's one of Anger's most tranquil works; his editing makes it soft, lush, and inviting. Eaux d'Artifice remains a secretive romp through a private garden, all for the masked figure's and the viewer-voyeur's pleasure."

1953–60: Inauguration of the Pleasure Dome and Hollywood Babylon 
In 1953, soon after the production of Eaux d'Artifice, Anger's mother died and he temporarily returned to the United States in order to assist with the distribution of her estate. It was during this return that he began to once more immerse himself in the artistic scene of California, befriending the film maker Stan Brakhage, who had been inspired by Fireworks, and the two collaborated on producing a film, but it was confiscated at the film lab for obscenity and presumably destroyed. Around this time, two of Anger's friends, the couple Renate Druks and Paul Mathison held a party based upon the theme of "Come As Your Madness"; Anger himself attended dressed in drag as the ancient Greek goddess Hekate. The party and its many costumes inspired Anger, who produced a painting of it, and asked several of those who attended to appear in a new film that he was creating – Inauguration of the Pleasure Dome. Inauguration, which was created in 1954, was a 38-minute surrealist work featuring many Crowleyan and Thelemite themes, with many of the various characters personifying various pagan gods such as Isis, Osiris and Pan. One of the actresses in the film was Marjorie Cameron, the widow of Jack Parsons, the influential American Thelemite who had died a few years previously, while Anger himself played Hecate. He would subsequently exhibit the film at various European film festivals, winning the Prix du Ciné-Club Belge and the Prix de l'Age d'Or, as well as screening it in the form of a projected triptych at Expo 58, the World Fair held in Brussels in 1958.

In 1955, Anger and his friend Alfred Kinsey traveled to the derelict Abbey of Thelema in Cefalù, Sicily, to film a short documentary titled Thelema Abbey. The abbey itself had been used by Aleister Crowley for his commune during the 1920s, and Anger restored many of the erotic wall-paintings that were found there, as well as performing certain Crowleyan rituals at the site. The documentary was made for the British television series Omnibus, but was later lost. The following year Kinsey died and Anger decided to return to Paris, where he was described at the time as being "extremely remote and lonely".

In desperate need of money, Anger and ghostwriter Elliott Stein wrote a book titled Hollywood Babylon in which he collected together gossip regarding celebrities, some of which he claims he had been told. This included claiming (with no corroboration or citing of sources) that Rudolph Valentino liked to play a sexually submissive role to dominant women, that Walt Disney was a drug user, addicted to opiates (reflected in the character of Goofy, who's perpetually stoned on cannabis), as well as describing the nature of the deaths of Peg Entwistle and Lupe Vélez. The work was not published in the United States initially, and it was first released by the French publisher Jean-Jacques Pauvert. A pirated (and incomplete) version was first published in the U.S. in 1965, with the official American version not being published until 1974. In response to a libel suit Gloria Swanson filed against Anger and the Hollywood Babylon publishers, he sent her a foot-long, sugar-filled coffin with "Here lies Gloria" painted on the lid and lined with a paper printed with Hebrew letters spelling "shalom." The coffin is preserved at the University of Texas Harry Ransom Center collection. After obtaining some financial backing from the publication of Hollywood Babylon, his next film project was The Story of O; it was essentially a piece of erotica featuring a heterosexual couple engaged in sadomasochistic sexual activities, although it refrained from showing any explicit sexual images.

1961–65: Scorpio Rising and Kustom Kar Kommandos 
In 1961, Anger once more returned to America, where he lived for a time with Marjorie Cameron. Meanwhile, he began work on a new feature, a film about the biker subculture, which he titled Scorpio Rising. For this, he employed a biker named Richard McAuley, and filmed him and some of his friends messing around, adding to it scenes of McAuley, or "Scorpio" as he became known, desecrating a derelict church. Anger incorporated more controversial visuals into the piece, including Nazi iconography, nudity, and clips of the life of Jesus Christ taken from Family Films' The Living Bible: Last Journey to Jerusalem. In Scorpio Rising, Anger intercuts images of Christ from the cheap religious film with those of Scorpio. The whole film has a soundtrack made up of popular 1960s songs, including "Blue Velvet" by Bobby Vinton, "Torture" by Kris Jensen and "I Will Follow Him" by Little Peggy March. Anger himself described the film as "a death mirror held up to American culture ... Thanatos in chrome, black leather, and bursting jeans." It immediately became popular on the underground cinema scene although was soon brought to court with complaints claiming that it was obscene. The jury ruled in favor of the prosecutors, and Scorpio Rising was banned, although this ban was subsequently overturned on appeal to the California State Supreme Court.

With Scorpio Rising finished and Anger now living in San Francisco, he went to the Ford Foundation, which had just started a program of giving out grants to filmmakers. He showed them his ideas for a new artistic short, titled Kustom Kar Kommandos, which they approved of, and gave him a grant of $10,000. Anger spent much of the money on living expenses and making alterations to some of his earlier films, so that by the time he actually created Kustom Kar Kommandos, it was only one scene long. The homoerotic film involved various shots of a young man polishing a drag strip racing car, accompanied by a pink background and The Paris Sisters' song "Dream Lover". Soon after, Anger struck a deal that allowed Hollywood Babylon to be officially published for the first time in the U.S., where it proved a success, selling two million copies during the 1960s. Around the same time Anger also translated Lo Duca's History of Eroticism into English for American publication.

1966–69: The hippie movement and Invocation of My Demon Brother 
The mid-1960s saw the emergence of the hippie scene and increasing use of the mind-altering drugs Anger had been using for many years. In particular, the hallucinogen LSD, which at the time was still legal in the U.S., was very popular, and in 1966 Anger released a version of his film Inauguration of the Pleasure Dome titled the "Sacred Mushroom Edition", which was screened to people while taking LSD, thereby heightening their sensory experience. By this time, Anger had become well known throughout the underground scene in the U.S., and several U.S. cinemas screened his better-known films all in one event. With this growing fame, Anger began to react to publicity in much the same way as his idol Aleister Crowley had done, for instance calling himself "the most monstrous moviemaker in the underground", a pun on the fact that Crowley had been labeled "the wickedest man in the world" by the British tabloids in the 1920s. Anger's underground fame allowed him to increasingly associate with other celebrities, including Anton LaVey, the founder of the Church of Satan, who named Anger godfather to his daughter Zeena Schreck. Despite their differing philosophies, Anger and LaVey became good friends and remained so for many years. But Anger also resented certain celebrities, such as Andy Warhol, who at the time was achieving success not only in the art world but also in the underground film scene. In 1980, Anger threw paint on the front door of a house Warhol had recently moved out of.

In 1966, Anger moved into the ground floor of a large 19th-century Victorian house in San Francisco known as the Russian Embassy. Around this time he began planning a new film, Lucifer Rising, echoing his Thelemite beliefs about the emerging Aeon of Horus. He tattooed the name of Lucifer on his chest and began searching for a young man who could symbolically become Lucifer, "the Crowned and Conquering Child" of the new Aeon, for the film. While living at the Russian Embassy, he met and lived with various young men who could fill the role, eventually settling on Bobby Beausoleil. Beausoleil founded a band, the Magic Powerhouse of Oz, to record the music for the film. In 1967, Anger said that the footage he had been filming for Lucifer Rising had been stolen, blaming Beausoleil, who denied the claims. Anger's unofficial biographer Bill Landis quotes Beausoleil as saying, "what had happened was that Kenneth had spent all the money that was invested in Lucifer Rising" and that he therefore invented the story to satisfy the film's creditors. Beausoleil and Anger fell out, with the former getting involved with Charles Manson and the Manson Family. Beausoleil tortured and murdered Gary Hinman in a drug robbery gone wrong, due to a deal involving the Straight Satans Motorcycle Club.

In the October 26, 1967 issue of Village Voice, Anger publicly reinvented himself by placing a full-page ad declaring "In Memoriam. Kenneth Anger. Filmmaker 1947–1967". He soon publicly reappeared, this time to claim that he had burned all of his early work. The next year, he traveled to London, where he first met John Paul Getty, Jr., who became Anger's patron, and also met and befriended Mick Jagger and Keith Richards, members of The Rolling Stones, as well as actress/model Anita Pallenberg. Anger decided to use much of the footage created for Lucifer Rising in a new film, Invocation of My Demon Brother, which starred Beausoleil, LaVey, Jagger and Richards, as well as Anger himself, the music for which had been composed by Jagger. It was released in 1969, and explored many of the Thelemic themes that Anger had originally intended for Lucifer Rising. Author Gary Lachman believes the film "inaugurat[ed] the midnight movie cult at the Elgin Theatre." The story of the film, its making, and the people involved inspired Zachary Lazar's novel Sway.

1970–81: Lucifer Rising 
Having used up much of the footage originally intended for Lucifer Rising for Invocation of My Demon Brother, Anger again set about to create "Lucifer Rising", a symbolic analogy of the coming Aeon of Horus as prophesied in the Thelemic sacred text, The Book of the Law. Anger persuaded the singer and actress Marianne Faithfull to appear in it. He also tried to convince his friend Mick Jagger to play the part of Lucifer in the film but Jagger refused. Instead he offered his brother Chris for the part. Anger accepted, but was not happy about it. Anger subsequently filmed eight minutes of film and showed it to the British National Film Finance Corporation who agreed to provide £15,000 in order for Anger to complete it – something that caused a level of outrage in the British press. With this money, he could afford to fly the cast and crew to both Germany and Egypt for filming. Anger befriended Led Zeppelin guitarist Jimmy Page around this time, the two sharing a great interest in Crowley. At Page's invitation, Anger travelled to Page's new home, Crowley's former residence Boleskine House located on the shores of Loch Ness in Scotland, to help the musician exorcise the building of what Page believed to be a headless man's ghost. Page subsequently agreed to produce the soundtrack for Lucifer Rising, and used the editing suite which was in the basement of his London home to shape the music which he produced. Anger later fell out with Page's partner Charlotte, who kicked him out of the house. In retaliation, Anger called a press conference in which he ridiculed Page and threatened to "throw a Kenneth Anger curse" on him. Page's music was dumped from the film and replaced in 1979 by music written and recorded by the imprisoned Bobby Beausoleil, with whom Anger had reconciled.

Meanwhile, Anger, who moved to a small apartment on the upper east side of Manhattan, took the footage that he had filmed for Rabbit's Moon in the 1950s, finally releasing the film in 1972, and again in a shorter version in 1979. Around the same time he also added a new soundtrack to Puce Moment and re-released it. It was also around this time that the publisher Marvin Miller produced a low budget documentary film based on Hollywood Babylon without Anger's permission, which upset Anger and led to a lawsuit. He also created a short film titled Senators in Bondage which was only available to private collectors and which has never been made publicly available, and had plans to make a film about Aleister Crowley titled The Wickedest Man in the World, but this project never got off the ground. In 1980, he holidayed with his friend, the playwright Tennessee Williams.

It was in 1981, a decade after starting the project, that he finally finished and released the 30-minute-long Lucifer Rising. Based upon the Thelemite concept that mankind had entered a new period known as the Aeon of Horus, Lucifer Rising was full of occult symbolism, starring Miriam Gibril as the Ancient Egyptian goddess Isis and Donald Cammell as her consort Osiris, as well as Marianne Faithfull as Jewish mythological figure Lilith and Leslie Huggins as Lucifer himself. Anger once again appeared in the film, starring as the Magus, the same role that he played in Invocation to My Demon Brother. He had surrealistically combined the roles that these characters played with footage of volcanoes, various ancient Egyptian temples and a Crowleyan adept reading from the man's texts.

1982–99: Retirement 
Soon after the release of Lucifer Rising, a PBS documentary of Anger and his films was made, titled Kenneth Anger's Magick, which was directed by Kit Fitzgerald, who later recalled interviewing him in his New York flat on a very hot July evening, during which Anger revealed that he was so broke that he had been forced to sell his air conditioner. Anger himself considered producing other films that would continue on from Lucifer Rising in a series, and he began referring to his finished film as "Part I: Sign Language", to be followed by two further parts. Nonetheless, these projects would never be finished, and Anger himself would not produce any further films for nearly two decades. In need of money, Anger subsequently released Hollywood Babylon II in 1984, as well as continuing to screen his films at various festivals and at universities, and continuing to attempt to produce Lucifer Rising II; around this time he began wearing an eyepatch to these public events, something likely due to him having been beaten up and getting a bruised eye, a story that he would bring up in various interviews, although partly changing who it was who had beaten him up in various versions of the story. In 1984, a notorious incident occurred when Anger was invited to appear on The Coca Crystal Show but upon arriving at the studio demanded that somebody pay for his taxi ride there, and when they refused, attacked the talent coordinator Maureen Ivice and tried to drag her into his taxi before she was rescued by other members of staff. Anger reportedly escaped the scene by flinging a $100 bill at the cab driver and screaming "Get me out of here!"

In 1986, he sold the video rights to his films, which finally appeared on VHS, allowing them to have greater publicity. The following year he attended the Avignon Film Festival in France where his work was being celebrated in commemoration of the 40th anniversary of Fireworks. Soon after this, he appeared in Kenneth Anger's Hollywood Babylon, a BBC documentary for the Arena series directed by Nigel Finch. In 1991, Anger moved to West Arenas Boulevard in Palm Springs, California, living in what was formerly the estate of his good friend Ruby Keeler where the British Film Institute sent Rebecca Wood to assist him in writing an autobiography, which was never actually produced. Instead, in 1995, Bill Landis, who had been an associate of Anger's in the early 1980s, wrote an unofficial biography of him, which Anger condemned, calling Landis "an avowed enemy".

In 1993, Anger visited Sydney and lectured at a season of his films at the Australian Film Institute Cinema in Paddington. In an interview given at the time with Black and White magazine,  Anger said he was staying in King's Cross and was putting the finishing touches to the final treatment on a feature film about Australian artist and occultist Rosaleen Norton. This project was unrealised.

2000–present: Return to filmmaking 

For twenty years from the early 1980s, Anger released no new material. In 2000, at the dawn of the new millennium, Anger began screening a new short film, the anti-smoking Don't Smoke That Cigarette, followed a year later by The Man We Want to Hang, which comprised images of Aleister Crowley's paintings that had been exhibited at a temporary exhibition in Bloomsbury, London. In 2004, he began showing Anger Sees Red, a short surrealistic film starring himself, and the same year also began showing another work, Patriotic Penis. He soon followed this with a flurry of other shorts, including Mouse Heaven, which consisted of images of Mickey Mouse memorabilia, Ich Will! and Uniform Attraction, all of which he showed at various public appearances. Anger's most recent project has been the Technicolor Skull with musician Brian Butler, described as a "magick ritual of light and sound in the context of a live performance", in which Anger plays the theremin, and Butler plays the guitar and other electronic instruments, behind a psychedelic backdrop of colors and skulls.

Anger makes an appearance in the 2008 feature documentary by Nik Sheehan about Brion Gysin and the Dreamachine titled FLicKeR. Anger also appears alongside Vincent Gallo in the 2009 short film "Night of Pan" written and directed by Brian Butler. In 2009 his work was featured in a retrospective exhibition at the MoMA PS1 in New York City, and the following year a similar exhibition took place in London.

Anger has finished writing Hollywood Babylon III, but has not yet published it, fearing severe legal repercussions if he did so. Of this he has stated that "The main reason I didn't bring it out was that I had a whole section on Tom Cruise and the Scientologists. I'm not a friend of the Scientologists." Despite withholding legal action against the highly critical 2015 film Going Clear, the Church of Scientology was known on earlier occasions to sue those making accusations against them.

Themes 

Several recurring themes can be seen within Anger's cinematic work. One of the most notable of these is homoeroticism; this was first seen in Fireworks (1947), which was based around Anger's own homosexual awakening, and featured various navy officers flexing their muscles, and a white liquid (often thought of as symbolising semen), pouring over the protagonist's body. Similar homoerotic imagery is found in Scorpio Rising (1963), which stars a muscled, topless, leather-clad biker, and Kustom Kar Kommandos (1965), where a young man sensually polishes a car, with close up shots of his tight-fitting jeans and crotch. Images of naked men also appear in Invocation of My Demon Brother (1969), where they are eventually filmed wrestling, and in Anger Sees Red (2004), in which a muscled, topless man performs press-ups.

Another recurring theme in Anger's films is that of the occult, particularly the symbolism of his own esoteric religion, Thelema. This is visible in Inauguration of the Pleasure Dome, Invocation of My Demon Brother and Lucifer Rising, all of which are based around the Thelemite concept of the Aeon of Horus and feature actors portraying various pagan gods. Anger himself linked the creation of film to the occult, particularly the practice of ceremonial magic, something that Aleister Crowley had been a noted practitioner of, and Anger once stated that "making a movie is casting a spell."

One of the central recurring images found in Anger's work is the concept of flames and light; in Fireworks there are various examples of this, including a burning Christmas tree, and it subsequently appears in many of his other works as well. This relates to the concept of Lucifer, a deity whom Anger devoted one of his films to, and whose name is Latin for "light bearer".

In many of his films, heavy use is made of music, both classical and pop, to accompany the visual imagery. For instance, in Scorpio Rising he makes use of the 1950s/1960s pop songs "Torture" by Kris Jensen, "I Will Follow Him" by Little Peggy March and "Blue Velvet" by Bobby Vinton. He first used music to accompany visuals in the 1941 work Who Has Been Rocking My Dreamboat?, where he used tracks by the Mills Brothers. His use of popular music to accompany his films has been cited as a key influence on the development of music videos and of MTV, although he has stated his dislike for the whole music video industry. On one occasion the band Combustible Edison asked him if he would direct a video to accompany their song "Bluebeard" but he declined the offer, believing that while music could be used to accompany film, it was pointless to do it the other way around.

Awards 
 Maya Deren Award, 1996
 Silver Lake Film Festival Spirit of Silver Lake Award (2000)
 San Francisco International Film Festival Golden Gate Persistence of Vision Award (2001)
 Los Angeles Film Critics Association Douglas Edwards Independent/Experimental Film/Video Award (2002), "for his body of work"; tied with Michael Snow, for *Corpus Callosum
 Anthology Film Archives, Life Achievement Award (2010)

Personal life 

Anger has always been an "extremely private individual," although he has given various interviews over the years, with one interviewer, David Wingrove, describing him in 2008 as "a joy. Gentle, soft-spoken, immaculately tanned, he looks a good two decades younger than his 78 years". In such interviews, he refuses to disclose information on his name change from Anglemyer to Anger, telling an interviewer who brought the topic up in 2004 that "You're being impertinent. It says Anger on my passport, that's all you need to know. I would stay away from that subject if I were you." In a 2010 interview, however, he said, "I just condensed my name. I knew it would be like a label, a logo. It's easy to remember." Anger is openly gay. He once joked that he was "somewhat to the right of the KKK" in his views about black people, opening him up to criticism for racism, though this was likely a "Crowley-esque joke". He supports the Tibetan independence movement.

Anger is an acknowledged Thelemite and belongs to the main Thelemic organization, the Ordo Templi Orientis. He viewed many of the men he associated with as living embodiments of Lucifer, a symbol of the Aeon of Horus in Thelemic philosophy, and had his own name inked onto his chest with the Lucifer tattoo. Anger has shown an interest in various other religious movements, particularly those that relate in some way to occultism. For instance, Kenneth was a lifelong friend of Anton LaVey from before the founding of the Church of Satan in the 1960s and even lived with him and his family during the 1990s. LaVey also made an appearance in one of Anger's films, Invocation of My Demon Brother (1969) as a devilish priest. Anger describes himself as a "pagan" and refuses to consider himself to be a Satanist. He also characterized Wicca as being a "lunar", feminine religion in contrast with the "solar" masculinity of Thelema.

Filmography

Books

References

Notes

Citations

Works cited

Further reading 

 Eaton, Thomas Dylan (2008). Cinema, Messianism and Crime, Parkett 83, pp. 197-205.
Eaton, Thomas Dylan (2008), 1000 WORDS; KENNETH ANGER, Artforum, September, pp. 412-415.
.

External links 
 
 
 bentclouds.com. Essay on Kustom Kar Kommandos Non-Normative Sex in Kustom Kar Kommandos.
 The Film Journal. Review of Alice Hutchison's book on Anger
 Artforum 1000 Words
 Esquire Kenneth Anger: Where The Bodies Are Buried, by Mick Brown.

1927 births
American experimental filmmakers
American male child actors
American modern pagans
American non-fiction writers
American people of German descent
American Thelemites
Film directors from California
American gay actors
American gay writers
American gay artists
LGBT film directors
LGBT people from California
Gay screenwriters
American LGBT screenwriters
Living people
Male actors from Santa Monica, California
Writers from Santa Monica, California
American people of English descent